Athetis ignava is a moth of the family Noctuidae. It is found in Southern and Eastern Africa, including the islands of the Indian Ocean.

The wingspan is approx. 30–35 mm

References

External links

Caradrinini
Moths described in 1852
Moths of the Comoros
Moths of Africa
Moths of Madagascar
Moths of Mauritius
Moths of Réunion